John Malcolm Stahl (January 21, 1886 – January 12, 1950) was an American film director and producer.

Life and work 

He was born Jacob Morris Strelitsky in Baku (Azerbaijan) to a Russian Jewish family. When he was a child, his family left the Russian Empire and moved to the United States, settling in New York City. At a young age he took the name John Malcolm Stahl and began working, first as a theatre actor and then in the city's growing motion picture industry. He directed his first silent film short in 1913.

In 1919 he signed on with Louis B. Mayer Pictures in Hollywood. In 1924 he was part of the Mayer team that founded MGM Studios. In 1927, Stahl was one of the thirty-six founding members of the Academy of Motion Picture Arts and Sciences. With the industry's transition to talkies and feature-length films, Stahl successfully made the adjustment.  From 1927 through 1929 Stahl was an executive at the short-lived independent studio Tiffany Pictures, and renamed the company "Tiffany-Stahl Productions".

In 1930 he joined Universal Pictures where he directed in 1934 the film Imitation of Life, which was nominated for an Academy Award for Best Picture. The following year, he directed Magnificent Obsession, starring Irene Dunne and Robert Taylor. Both films were later remade in the 1950s by director Douglas Sirk.

John Stahl continued to produce and direct major productions as well as filler shorts up to the time of his death. Some of his other notable directorial work was for The Keys of the Kingdom in 1944 and the 1945 film noir, Leave Her to Heaven starring Gene Tierney, who was nominated for Best Actress.

Stahl died in Hollywood in 1950. He is interred at Forest Lawn Memorial Park Cemetery in Glendale, California.

He was married to actress and writer Frances Irene Reels  from 1918 to her death in 1926,  and to actress Roxana McGowan  from 1931 to his death.

On February 8, 1960, for his contributions to the motion pictures industry, Stahl received a star on the Hollywood Walk of Fame at 6546 Hollywood Boulevard.

Filmography

Director

 A Boy and the Law (1913) (uncredited) (Lost) 
 The Lincoln Cycle (1917) (uncredited) 
 Wives of Men (1918) (Lost) 
 Suspicion (1918) (Lost) 
 Her Code of Honor (1919) 
 The Woman Under Oath (1919)
  (1920) (Lost) 
 The Woman in His House (1920) (Lost) 
 Sowing the Wind (1921)
 The Child Thou Gavest Me (1921) 
 Suspicious Wives (1921)
 One Clear Call (1922)
 The Song of Life (1922)
 The Dangerous Age (1923) (Lost) 
 The Wanters (1923) (Lost - one reel survives) 
 Why Men Leave Home (1924)
 Husbands and Lovers (1924)
 Fine Clothes (1925) (Lost) 
 The Gay Deceiver (1926) (Lost) 
 Memory Lane (1926) 
 Lovers? (1927) (Lost) 
 In Old Kentucky (1927)
 A Lady Surrenders (1930)
 Seed (1931)
 Strictly Dishonorable (1931)
 Back Street (1932)
 Only Yesterday (1933)
 Imitation of Life (1934)
 Magnificent Obsession (1935)
 Parnell (1937)
 Letter of Introduction (1938) 
 When Tomorrow Comes (1939) 
 Our Wife (1941)
 Immortal Sergeant (1943)
 Holy Matrimony (1943)
 The Eve of St. Mark (1944)
 The Keys of the Kingdom (1944)
 Leave Her to Heaven (1945)
 The Foxes of Harrow (1947)
 The Walls of Jericho (1948)
 Father Was a Fullback (1949)
 Oh, You Beautiful Doll (1949)

Producer

 The Child Thou Gavest Me (1921)
 Husbands and Lovers (1924)
 Memory Lane (1926)
 Lovers (1927)
 Wild Geese (1927)
 In Old Kentucky (1927)
 The Haunted Ship (1927)
 Streets of Shanghai (1927)
 A Woman Against the World (1928)
 The Devil's Skipper (1928)
 Nameless Men (1928)
 The Man in Hobbles (1928)
 The Tragedy of Youth (1928)
 Their Hour  (1928)
 Bachelor's Paradise (1928)
 The House of Scandal (1928)
 The Scarlet Dove (1928)
 Ladies of the Night Club (1928)
 Stormy Waters (1928)
 Clothes Make the Woman (1928)
 Green Grass Widows (1928)
 Prowlers of the Sea (1928)
 Lingerie (1928)
 Beautiful But Dumb (1928)
 The Grain of Dust (1928)
 Domestic Meddlers (1928)
 The Toilers (1928)
 The Naughty Duchess (1928)
 The Power of Silence (1928)
 The Cavalier (1928)
 Marriage by Contract (1928)
 The Floating College (1928)
 The Gun Runner (1928)
 Tropical Nights (1928)
George Washington Cohen (1928)
 Broadway Fever (1929)
 The Rainbow (1929)
 Lucky Boy (1929)
 The Spirit of Youth (1929)
 The Devil's Apple Tree (1929)
 Molly and Me (1929)
 My Lady's Past (1929)
 The Lost Zeppelin (1929)
 New Orleans (1929)
 Two Men and a Maid (1929)
 Midstream (1929)
 Whispering Winds (1929)
 Mister Antonio (1929)
 Painted Faces (1929)
 Seed (1931)
 Strictly Dishonorable (1931)
 Magnificent Obsession (1935)
 Parnell (1937)
 Letter of Introduction (1938)
 When Tomorrow Comes (1939)
 Our Wife (1941)

References

External links

John M. Stahl; AllMovie/biography

Academy of Motion Picture Arts and Sciences founders
American film producers
Film directors from New York City
1886 births
1950 deaths
Burials at Forest Lawn Memorial Park (Glendale)
American people of Azerbaijani-Jewish descent
American people of Russian-Jewish descent
Russian Jews
People from Baku
Deaths from coronary artery disease
Emigrants from the Russian Empire to the United States